The 2020 Bulgarian Supercup was the 17th Bulgarian Supercup, an annual Bulgarian football match played between the winners of the previous season's First Professional Football League and Bulgarian Cup. The game was played between the champions of the 2019-20 First League, Ludogorets Razgrad, and the 2020 Bulgarian Cup winners, Lokomotiv Plovdiv.

This was Ludogorets's eighth Bulgarian Supercup appearance and Lokomotiv Plovdiv's fourth. The two teams played each other twice: in 2012 and in last season. On both occasions Ludogorets won the trophy.

Lokomotiv Plovdiv won their second supercup following their success in 2004. The goal was scored by Dimitar Iliev.

Match details

Post-match reactions
Lokomotiv Plovdiv owner Hristo Krusharski was overjoyed due to the victory, claiming that he had a premonition before the game, praising the collective efforts of the team and expressing the viewpoint that the "railwaymen" have great ambitions for the European tournaments and the next season in the league, hoping to make up for the disappointing finish outside the top 3 in the previous campaign. Assistant manager Aleksandar Tunchev who was in charge of the team during the Supercup because of Bruno Akrapović serving a suspension expressed his gratitude to the players, some of whom were returning from a quarantine and also insisted that everyone should remain focused on the upcoming matches. Lokomotiv captain Dimitar Iliev was satisfied that his team had been quite convincing and dominated the hosts from Razgrad unlike any other. Sports director Georgi Ivanov regarded Lokomotiv's consistency as an indication of the team's class and expressed hope that the inertia the team had accumulated would carry over into the 2020/2021 season. Ludogorets manager Pavel Vrba acknowledged issues with the team performance, especially when it came to the offensive players, as well as ill-discipline leading to the red card, though he also insisted that Jordan Ikoko had been provoked. Ludogorets captain Svetoslav Dyakov considered his team's play to have been poor and emphasized the need for the right lessons to be drawn for the next matches.

References

2020
Supercup
Sport in Plovdiv
Bulgaria
Supercup 2020
Supercup 2020